The United Nations Spatial Data Infrastructure (UNSDI) is an institutional and technical mechanism for establishing system coherence for the exchange and applications of geospatial data and information for UN activities and supporting SDI (Spatial Data Infrastructure) development activities in Member Countries.



Background of UNSDI
UNSDI is an initiative of the United Nations Geographic Information Working Group (UNGIWG), a voluntary network of UN professionals working in the fields of cartography and geographic information science.

UNSDI aims to contribute to the mission of the United Nations, from to peacekeeping to humanitarian relief, from climate change to disaster reduction, response and recovery, from environmental protection to poverty reduction, food security, water management and economic development and to contribute to the realization of the UN Millennium Development Goals. By facilitating efficient global and local access, exchange and utilization of geospatial information, UNSDI will make the United Nations system more effective and support its “Delivering as One” policies.

Spatial data infrastructures provide the institutional and technical foundation of policies, standards and procedures that enable organizations and information systems to interact in a way that facilitates spatial data discovery, evaluation and applications.

Given that UN agencies vary in their ability to utilise and manage geospatial information it is foreseen that UNSDI will reduce development and operational costs by working together to achieve economies of scale through generic standards, guidelines and implementation tools. Thus, the development of UNSDI is considered essential for increasing system coherence in the use and exchange of geospatial data and information for UN activities.

In the short term, UNSDI is an investment into the capacities of the United Nations System to manage its existing geo-spatial assets more effectively. Additionally UNSDI may serve as a model and vehicle for capacity building in some Member States that request assistance from the United Nations in managing and applying geospatial data to support their national development agenda.

Development at global level
At present the Center of Excellence for UNSDI has been established. The first phase of UNSDI developments consist of a Gazetteer, a Geospatial Data Warehouse, and a Visualization Facility. Two donor countries are involved in the present developments: Australia and Germany. Australia is funding the Gazetteer project, Germany has supplied office and staffing facilities for the UNSDI Center of Excellence in Bonn. The proposal for funding of the Geospatial Data Warehouse and associated activities is to be submitted to the Netherlands in Q4 of 2012.

Development at regional level
The following Regional Organizations joined the process:
 Regional Centre for Mapping of Resources for Development (RCMRD) in Nairobi, Kenya
 International Centre for Integrated Mountain Development (ICIMOD) in Kathmandu, Nauru, Nepal
 Regional Centre for Training in Aerospace Surveys (RECTAS) in Ile-Ife, Nigeria.

Development at national level
Underlying the UNSDI is the need to link UNSDI with national public and private geospatial and SDI capacities, both in developed and developing countries. To this end National Coordination Offices (NCOs) for UNSDI are to be established. Below the established NCOs are listed.

Although some of the NCOs use the acronym UN and the UN emblem in their official title, they are not affiliated with the United Nations. Use of the emblem is restricted, based on General Assembly resolution 92(I),1946, and should be not be used by non-UN entities.

With the following countries discussions on UNSDI participation are ongoing: Australia, Austria, Brazil, Cape Verde, Chile, Jamaica, India, Japan, Mexico, Morocco, Mongolia, Nigeria, Spain and South Africa.

National Coordination Offices
 Netherlands http://www.unsdi.nl
 Czech Republic https://web.archive.org/web/20080929085051/http://www.unsdi.cz/
 Hungary https://web.archive.org/web/20080929234143/http://www.unsdi.hu/

References

 UNSDI gazetteer http://www.csiro.au/gazetteer
 UN Flag and Emblem http://www.un.org/Depts/dhl/maplib/flag.htm

Documents
Key documentation on the UNSDI initiative can be found at and downloaded from http://www.ungiwg.org/documents

National UNSDI portals 
 The Netherlands

(Jan Cees Venema, UNSDI-NCO)

Geographic information systems
Geographic societies
Organizations established by the United Nations